The Applied Probability Trust is a UK-based non-profit foundation for study and research in the mathematical sciences, founded in 1964 and based in the School of Mathematics and Statistics at the University of Sheffield, which it has been affiliated with since 1964.

Publications
The Applied Probability Trust (APT) published two world leading research journals, the Journal of Applied Probability and Advances in Applied Probability, until 2016. Joe Gani, founding editor for the two journals, intended to create outlets for researchers in applied probability, as they increasingly had difficulty in getting published in the few journals in probability and statistics that existed at that time. The Journal of Applied Probability appeared first, in 1964, and with a prominent editorial board from the beginning, it secured contributions from renowned probabilists. The Advances in Applied Probability started in 1969. In 2016, Cambridge University Press took over the publication of the two journals.

In addition to these two journals, two further magazine style publications have been published, The Mathematical Scientist and Mathematical Spectrum. 
 Journal of Applied Probability (1964 – present)
 Advances in Applied Probability (1972 – present)
 The Mathematical Scientist (1976 – 2018)
 Mathematical Spectrum (1968 – 2016)
To mark special occasions, the Applied Probability Trust commissions special issues of the journal. These include:

 Perspectives in Probability and Statistics (1975)
 Essays in Statistical Science (1982)
 Essays in Time Series and Allied Processes (1986)
 A Celebration of Applied Probability (1988)
 Studies in Applied Probability (1994)
 Probability, Statistics and Seismology (2001)
 Stochastic Methods and Their Applications (2004)
 New Frontiers in Applied Probability (2011)
 Celebrating 50 Years of the Applied Probability Trust (2014)
 Probability, Analysis and Number Theory (2016)
 Branching and Applied Probability (2018)

Board of Trustees, Past and Present 
The Applied Probability Trust was set up by Joe Gani in 1964 along with Norma McArthur, Edward Hannan and support from the London Mathematical Society. Over the history of the APT, many world renowned probabilists have accepted the invitation to join the APT board of trustees. A complete list of trustees, past and present can be found below:
 Joe Gani (1964 – 2016)
 Norma McArthur (1964 – 1984)
 Edward J. Hannan (1964 – 1994)
 London Mathematical Society (1964 – 2008)
 Chris Heyde (1984 – 2008)
 Daryl Daley, Australian National University (1997 – present)
 Søren Asmussen (2008 – 2020)
 Peter Taylor, University of Melbourne (2008 – present)
 Frank Kelly (2008 – 2021)
 Peter Glynn, Stanford University (2014 – present)
 Ilya Molchanov, University of Bern (2019 – present)
 Jiangang (Jim) Dai, Cornell University (2019 – present)
 Remco van der Hofstad, Eindhoven University of Technology (2019 – present)
 Christina Goldschmidt, Oxford University (2021 – present)
 Nigel Bean, University of Adelaide (2021 – present)

Past and Current Editors 
 Joe Gani, Founding Editor-in-Chief (1964 – 1989)
 Chris Heyde, Editor-in-Chief (1990 – 2007)
 Søren Asmussen, Editor-in-Chief (2005 – 2015)
 Peter Glynn, Editor-in-Chief (2016 – 2018)
 Peter Taylor, Editor-in-Chief (2019 – present)
 Nicole Bäuerle, Deputy Editor-in-Chief (2022 – present)
The APT board of trustees decided who holds the position of Editor-in-Chief.

Applied Probability Trust Prizes 
The Applied Probability Trust as a long history of donating funds to institutions around the world to support the awarding of prizes. The form a prize takes is at the discretion of the host institution, however the award title often comes with small cash sum or funds to purchase books. Current prizes include:
 Australian National University: Applied Probability Trust Prize
 CWI, Amsterdam: Applied Probability Trust Prize
 Imperial College, London: Hyman Levy Prize
 The Open University: George Barnard Prize
 University of Adelaide: Applied Probability Trust Prize
 University of California, Santa Barbara: Abraham Wald Prize and Ruth and Joe Gani Prize
 University of Cambridge: Bartlett Prize and Rollo Davidson Trust
 University of Kentucky: R. L. Anderson Prize
 Université Libre de Bruxelles: Ruth and Joe Gani prize
 University of Manchester: M. S. Bartlett Prize
 University of Melbourne: Norma McArthur Prize
 University of Newcastle, New South Wales: Applied Probability Trust Statistics Prize
 University of Sheffield: Sir Edward Collingwood Prize
 University of Sydney: Applied Probability Trust Prize
 University of Waterloo: George Barnard Prize
 University of Western Australia: Richard Tweedie Memorial Applied Probability Trust Prize and Abraham Wald Prize
 University of Wollongong: William Sealy Gosset Prize and Applied Probability Trust Prize

References 

Mathematical societies
1964 establishments in the United Kingdom
Organizations established in 1964
University of Sheffield
Learned societies of the United Kingdom